Bunninadden is a Gaelic Athletic Association club based in the south of the county, comprising the parish of Bunninadden in County Sligo, Ireland.

The club was founded in 1886 by Andrew Marren and John O’Dowd.

James Kearins led Bunninadden to a 1999 league title and then to the 2000 Sligo Senior Football Championship title, the club's first for more than eight decades, before being appointed manager of the Sligo county team in 2003.

In 2000, Bunninadden win the Sligo Senior Football Championship and Owen B Hunt cup for the second time in 109 years beating Coolera/Strandhill with a last minute Padraig Doohan goal, themselves almost a century without a senior title. With James Kerins at the helm backed by Richard Brennan and John Spellman the clubs first senior title in living memory was a fantastic occasion and a testament to many years of hard work by countless club members over the years.

In the same year the club won Minor and U-16 titles and as the club announced itself as a new force in Sligo club football.

In 2006 Bunninadden returned to the County Final stage are defeating rivals Eastern Harps in a thrilling one point game in the semi final. The final was an all south Sligo affair against neighbours Curry in what was one of the most memorable senior finals in memory. It certainly was a game of two halves with Bunninadden going in at half time with a 6 point lead, but ended up losing 1-15 to 2-9.

2008 was a mixed year, on the underage field Bunninadden claimed 4 titles and done the double in the Minor. Unfortunately the seniors did not preform as well and were relegated to Intermediate along with Geevagh and Drumcliffe/Rosses Point Point.

The Juniors also managed to regain the Junior crown last won in 2003.

In 2009 Bunninadden reached its first ever Connacht final, although it was not on the football field but through the means of Scór. The music group came second in a tie beak losing out to the All-Ireland Champions Corofin.

In late June work commenced on the new dressing rooms at Bunninadden Community Park.

The club reached the intermediate final in 2009 against Geevagh. Leading as the clocked ticked down we were agonisingly beaten by a last minute Geevagh goal and missed out on an immediate return to senior football 1-08 to 1-07. The following 2 campaigns 2010 and 2011 both ended in disappointment at the semi-final stage against Drumcliffe.

In 2012 with Gerry Perry now at the helm St Pats would provide the opposition at the semi final stage and this time we would not be denied cruising home to book a final spot against our now familiar foe  Drumcliffe–Rosses Point. Under the lights in Tourlestrane for the first ever flood lit final we prevailed in a low scoring encounter 1-07 to 0-06 to claim a first ever intermediate title for the club.

Looking to build on their Sligo success the club then faced St Aidans of Roscommon in the Connacht semi final in Kiltoom.  A strong St Aidans team started quickly and raced into a lead that at half-time looked insurmountable, 2-10 to 0-04. The second half didn't start much better for Bunninadden falling even further behind and with 43 minutes on the clock and trailing by 12 it appeared a final place against Charlestown was beyond even the most optimistic supporters hopes. However in the most remarkable 17 minutes of football ever produced by the club we over-turned the deficit to win on a scoreline of 3-11 to 3-10 and spark a pitch invasion rarely seen from our loyal support. A week later against a strong Charlestown team we were defeated narrowly in the clubs first ever Connacht football final 0-14 to 0-08 to bookend a successful return to the senior ranks for the club.

2013 saw the club struggle to maintain the highs of 2012 and after a long campaign we were relegated back to intermediate. 2014 saw the club beaten by Shamrock Gaels in the semi final.

2015 and 2016 saw the club remain intermediate.

For the 2017 season we struck a deal with neighbours Ballymote GAA to amalgamate our underage structures from U12 to U18 for at least 3 years and quite possibly longer. This step was taken due to the simple maths many rural clubs currently face of small playing numbers and the desire to provide good quality competition and structures for our players. We are now competing at 'A' level and in the long run both clubs can only benefit. Hopefully in the not too distant future we will begin to see the benefits in our Senior team as these young players emerge.

2017 saw the first fruits of this when our U14s won the A League beating St. Mary's in the final in Markievicz Park.

In 2019 under the stewardship of John O'Flaherty we reached another intermediate final against Geevagh after defeating Easkey in the semi final. Geevagh however proved too strong on the day and ran out deserving winners.

2020 and 2021 saw the world disrupted by Covid19 but 2021 did see saw us winning the division 3 league and Abbott Cup Finals. 2021 also was a big year for our underage amalgamation with the minors winning the B championship in some style. Luke Marren who played a key role on this team also made a vital contribution to Sligo minors Connnacht Championship Win in 2021. Luke scored 9 points in the semi final and 11 in the final Vs Roscommon and went on to be named in the Minor All Star team of the year. A great personal achievement and a proud one for our club.

In 2022, our seniors managed to regain Senior status in the league, narrowly missing out in the league final to Curry. Led by Willie Gormley and a team of club stalwarts, the club fought well to a intermediate championship semi-final, losing out to St. St. Molaise Gaels Gaels, who went on to win the final convincingly.

In 2022 our u21s, amalgamated with Ballymote GAA, won the "A" county final, beating St Molaise Gaels in the final.

Honours
 Sligo Senior Football Championship:
 1891, 2000
 Sligo Intermediate Football Championship:
 2012
 Sligo Junior Football Championship:
 1953, 1963, 1973, 1979, 2003, 2008 (Killavil - 1927)
 Sligo Under 20 Football Championship:
 1992, 1993 (as St. Nathy's, amalgamated with Coolaney/Mullinabreena), 2022 (amalgamated with Ballymote GAA)
 Sligo Senior Football League (Division 1):
 1999, 2004
 Sligo Intermediate Football League Division 3 (ex Div. 2):
 1994, 1997, 2021
 Sligo Junior Football League (Division 5):
 1979
 Kiernan Cup:
 2006
 Sligo Under-14 C Football League 
 2013
 Sligo Minor C Football

References

 Bunninadden GAA website
 https://www.independent.ie/regionals/sligochampion/sport/gaa/ballymotebunninadden-are-the-sligo-u21-champions-after-victory-over-st-molaise-gaels-42128744.html

Gaelic games clubs in County Sligo
Sligo GAA
GAA clubs by GAA county